Security holograms are labels with a hologram printed onto it for sale security reasons. Holograms on security labels are very difficult to forge because they are replicated from a master hologram which requires expensive, specialized and technologically advanced equipment. They are used widely in several banknotes around the world, in particular those that are of high denominations. They are also used in passports, credit and bank cards as well as quality products.  

Holograms are classified into different types with reference to the degree of level of optical security incorporated in them during the process of master origination. The different classifications are described below:

2D / 3D "hologram" images

These are by far the most common type of hologram – and in fact they are not holograms in any true sense of the words. The term "hologram" has taken on a secondary meaning due to the widespread use of a multilayer image on credit cards and driver licenses. This type of "hologram" consists of two or more images stacked in such a way that each is alternately visible depending upon the angle of perspective of the viewer. The technology here is similar to the technology used for the past 50 years to make red safety night reflectors for bicycles, trucks, and cars.

These holograms (and therefore the artwork of these holograms) may be of two layers (i.e. with a background and a foreground) or three layers (with a background, a middle ground and a foreground). In the case of the two-layer holograms, the matter of the middle ground is usually superimposed over the matter of the background of the hologram. These holograms display a unique multilevel, multi-color effect. These images have one or two levels of flat graphics “floating” above or at the surface of the hologram. The matter in the background appears to be under or behind the hologram, giving the illusion of depth.

Dot matrix
These holograms have a maximum resolution of 10 micrometers per optical element and are produced on specialized machines making forgery difficult and expensive. To design optical elements, several algorithms are used to shape scattered radiation patterns.

Flip flop 
Flip-flop hologram master origination is a technique used to produce holograms that display flip-flop effect. They are produced used 2D/3D master shooting system. This two channel effect of 2D/3D holograms displays two different images from different angles. These holograms are often fabricated using supreme quality material. The final master obtained from this flip-flop mastering technique are used to manufacture holograms which gives flip-flop effects. Having an excellent blend of 2D/3D and flipping images offers holographic images an excellent depth and a dazzling appeal.

Electron-beam lithography 
These types of holograms are created using highly sophisticated and very expensive electron-beam lithography systems. This kind of technology allows the creation of surface holograms with a resolution of up to 0.1 micrometers (254,000 dpi). This technique requires development of various algorithms for designing optical elements that shapes scattered radiation patterns. This type of hologram offers features like the viewing of four lasers at a single point, 2D/3D raster text, switch effects, 3D effects, concealed images, laser readable text and true color images.

The various kinds of features possible in security holograms are mentioned below:

Concealed images

These usually take the form of very thin lines and contours. Concealed images can be seen at large angle light diffraction, and at one particular angle only.

Guilloché patterns (high resolution line patterns)

These are sets of thin lines of a complicated geometry (guilloché patterns) drawn with high resolution. The technology allows continuous visual changes of colour along each separated lines.

Kinetic images

They can be seen when the conditions of hologram observations are being changed. Turning or inclining the hologram allows the movements of certain features of the image to be studied.

Microtexts or nanotexts

Dot matrix holograms are capable of embedding microtext at various sizes. There are three types of microtexts in holograms: high contrast microtexts of size 50 – 150 micrometres; diffractive grating filled microtexts of size 50 – 150 micrometres low contrast microtexts. Microtexts of sizes smaller than 50 micrometres are referred to as nanotext. Nanotext with sizes of less than 50 micrometres can be observed with a microscope only.

Covert laser readable images

Dot matrix holograms also support covert laser readable (CLR) imagery, where a simple laser device may be used to verify the hologram's authenticity. Computing CLR images is a complicated mathematical task that involves solving ill-posed problems. There are two types of CLR: Dynamic CLR and Multigrade CLR. Dynamic CLR is a set of CLR fragments that produce animated images on the screen as the control device moves along the hologram surface. Multigrade CLR images produce certain images on the screen of the controlling device, which differ in the first and minus first orders of laser light diffraction. As a variant, a hidden image which is both negative and positive, in plus one and minus one order respectively, may be created.

More recently, novel computer-generated holograms have been proposed working with structured light carrying phase singularities. Such optical elements further improve the security level, since the encoded information only appears when the input illumination is endowed with the correct intensity and phase distribution.

Computer-synthesized 2D/3D and 3D images

This technology allows 2D / 3D images to be combined with other security features (microtexts, concealed images, CLR etc.)  This combination effect cannot be achieved using any other traditional technologies of origination. 2D/3D hologram masters are developed in 2D/3D master shooting lab that incorporates highly sensitive machines and advanced equipment such as microprocessor-controlled automatic positioning equipment, optical table, He-Cd laser, laser power controller, silver coatings and other related technologies. The final master obtained from 2D/3D mastering is used to manufacture 2D/3D hologram stickers. These stickers consist of a multitude of two-dimensional layers with images placed one behind the other thereby offering excellent depth. These stickers are colorful images with 3D depth between different layers.

True colour images

True colour images are very effective decorative pictures. When synthesized by a computer, they may include microtexts, hidden images, and other security features, yielding attractive, high-security holograms. True Color hologram masters can be produced using 2D/3D master shooting system. The final master obtained from this mastering technique comprises true photographic images like images of people, animals, flags, etc. This type of holograms can’t be duplicated if in case they can’t obtain the original photo. True color holograms are one of the best ways to prevent counterfeiters from duplicating.

See also
Security printing

References

External links 

Theft
Security
Holography
Authentication methods
Anti-counterfeiting